Manitou station  is a limited-service stop on the Metro-North Railroad's Hudson Line. It serves the hamlet of Manitou in the southwestern corner of Philipstown in Putnam County, New York. The station is open part-time, serving one weekday peak hour train in each direction and six weekend trains each direction.

The Manitou station is one of three stations – along with Breakneck Ridge on the Hudson Line and Appalachian Trail on the Harlem Line – that receives limited passenger service. Like these stations, it serves mainly hikers visiting nearby state parks in the Hudson Highlands. There is no elevated platform and facilities at the station, one of two on the line adjacent to a grade crossing, are limited to a small shelter with the current schedule posted inside. The station predates the merger of New York Central and Pennsylvania Railroads.

This station is the least used station on the Hudson Line, with only 42 passengers per week in 2018.

History 
The station closed on July 1, 1973 along with several other stations in Penn Central's Metropolitan Region. It reopened in 1983.

Station layout
The station has two short low-level side platforms, which are each long enough for just one door of one car to receive and discharge passengers.

In popular culture
The Manitou station was featured in the television series Girls, in the episode "Video Games,"  in which Lena Dunham's character Hannah accompanies Jessa on a visit to her estranged father.

References

External links

 Station from Google Maps Street View

Metro-North Railroad stations in New York (state)
Former New York Central Railroad stations
Railway stations in Putnam County, New York
Railway stations closed in 1973
Railway stations in the United States opened in 1983